Fanagalo, or Fanakalo, is a vernacular or pidgin based primarily on Zulu with input from English and a small amount of Afrikaans input. It is used as a lingua franca, mainly in the gold, diamond, coal and copper mining industries in South Africa and to a lesser extent in the Democratic Republic of the Congo, Namibia, Zambia, and Zimbabwe.  Although it is used as a second language only, the number of speakers was estimated as "several hundred thousand" in 1975.   By the time independence came – or in the case of South Africa, universal suffrage – English had become sufficiently widely spoken and understood that it became the lingua franca, enabling different ethnic groups in the same country to communicate with each other, and Fanakalo use declined.

Etymology 
The name "Fanakalo" comes from strung-together Nguni forms  meaning "like + of + that" and has the meaning "do it like this", reflecting its use as a language of instruction.

As the indigenous people from whom Fanagalo originated traditionally had no written language, the orthography of Fanagalo is not standardized; for example, the sounds of W and B are very close.

Like Turkish, Fanagalo is characterized by a certain amount of vowel harmony, wherein a vowel in a prefix is changed according to the subsequent vowel.  In the Nguni tongues, the prefix  or  denotes the singular, while  or  signifies the plural – hence  = a man;  = men, particularly when applied to tribes, e.g. .  Similarly, the prefix  or  indicates the language spoke by that tribe.  e.g. men of the  tribe are called  (spelling is not standardized), and they speak ; Bembas speak ; Tswanas live in Botswana, formerly called Bechuanaland.

 thus is the "language" derived from  = "there", with reduplication for emphasis.

History and usage
Fanagalo is one of a number of African pidgin languages that developed during the colonial period to promote ease of communication in South Africa. It is also known as the mining language that was spoken by mineworkers in order to break the language barrier. It is uncertain as to how this pidgin language was developed in the first place as there are different theories coming from different sources.

The most common theory is that Fanakalo was made as a result of men speaking different languages (coming from different cultural backgrounds throughout South Africa and its neighboring states) that went to work in the mines during the late 19th century. Eventually, these languages got mixed up and a new dialect was formed to break the language barrier amongst mineworkers. Fanakalo had spread across the country and throughout Southern Africa. Therefore, Fanakalo was spoken as a "contact language" in the mines between people originating from different tribes in South Africa and from different countries in Southern Africa, and between foremen and workers [Afrikaans and English-speaking] Whites, and European  (such as Portuguese, Polish and German) immigrants contributing to the requirement of Fanakalo for communication on the mines. However, some researchers disagree with this theory because Fanakalo is mostly Zulu with a little bit of Afrikaans and English, yet the borrowed words from other languages that came from across the country and neighboring states (such as Mozambique, Zimbabwe etc.) are not common, but the mere fact that this pidgin language was/is mostly spoken by mineworkers that came from different tribes in the country and from neighboring states and the fact that it's even spoken throughout the entire region of Southern Africa validates this theory. 

Another theory (which is suggested by Adendorff and other researchers) is that Fanakalo actually came from the Colony of Natal as a way of communication between the black people that spoke the Zulu language and White people that spoke English and Afrikaans which is probably why this pidgin language is composed mostly of Zulu, Afrikaans and English. The arrival of the British settlers and Afrikaners in Natal are dated in the early 19th century: during the late 1830s, Cape Afrikaners travelled to Natal (and subsequently founded the Boer republic of Natalia (1840-1843)). Immigrants from England landed a decade later. The development of the pidgin language in Natal is attributed to ‘the acute difficulties of communication’. Fanakalo was also spoken with the Indian labourers that were imported to Natal by the British rulers and it eventually became a way of communication between the Indians and the Zulus as well. It is worth noting, however, that it is not influenced by Indian dialects. Indeed, the Indian languages had no economic value for interactions with the English and the Zulus. Fanakalo was then taught in the gold mines when Zulu men migrated from Natal to the Witwatersrand to work in the mines and this became the ultimate pidgin language throughout South Africa. Some researchers have also disagreed with this theory as well because, how was it possible that a pidgin language from Natal would just transfer to the gold mines in Witwatersrand and the diamond mines in Kimberly, but it was proven that there was a huge migration of Zulu people (which kept on rising) from Natal to the Transvaal province and the Cape province (some even went to the Orange Free State) to work in the mines which validates this theory because most mines in South Africa are located in areas that dominated by the native Sotho people and the Tswana people yet there's hardly any word in Fanakalo that is derived from these 2 languages and from other bantu languages from South Africa and it's neighboring states.

Adendorff describes two variants of the language, Mine Fanagalo and Garden Fanagalo. The latter name refers to its use with servants in households. It was previously known as Kitchen Kaffir. Both Fanagalo and Kitchen Kaffir contributed to linguistic colonization as Kitchen Kaffir was created to segregate the colonizers from the local communities and as means to exercise control. (The term "kaffir" tended, in South Africa, to be used as a derogatory term for black people, and is now considered extremely offensive. It is derived from the Arab word Kafir, meaning unbeliever.)

Two factors kept Fanagalo from achieving status as a primary language: the segregation of Fanagalo to work-related domains of use and an absence of leisure uses. Secondly, women and children were not permitted to speak Fanagalo, meaning that family communication did not exist and there were little ways to expand the uses of the pidgin. In the mid-20th century in South Africa there were Government efforts to promote and standardise Fanagalo as a universal second language, under the name of "Basic Bantu".

In contrast, mining companies in the early 21st century have attempted to phase out Fanagalo in favour of the pre-existing, local languages. In addition, there was a conscious effort to promote the use of English in domains where Fanagalo was predominantly used as a means of control.  Ravyse (2018) discusses Fanagalo's apparent resistance to opposing official policy, in spite of its ongoing stigma as a language for the illiterate. Fanagalo has become intertwined with the culture of the mining industry, and its continuation seems to hinge on the ongoing favour of its speaking community, rather than industry policy. Despite this decline in use, Fanagalo is still accepted as a part of mining culture and identity and is seen as a de facto policy and maintains its significance in its domain of use. The strong identity Fangalo speakers shared enabled homogeneity and therefore they were resistant to the inclusion of English and is likely why the pidgin is still used today. 

Mining aside, Adendorff also suggests that Fanagalo has unfavourable and negative connotations for many South Africans. However, he raises the point that Fanagalo is sometimes used between white South Africans, particularly expatriates, as a signal of South African origin and a way of conveying solidarity in an informal manner. That role has of late largely been taken over by Afrikaans; even among English speaking South African expatriates. In the latter half of the 20th century, holiday makers from the Rhodesias often used to go on holiday to Lourenço Marques in Mozambique (now Maputo), where many people speak Portuguese – but most also spoke a form of Fanagalo.

Language features and variants
Mine Fanagalo in South Africa and Zimbabwe is based mostly on Zulu vocabulary (about 70%), with English (about 25%) and some words from Afrikaans (5%). It does not have the range of Zulu inflections, and it tends to follow English word order. 

Adendorff describes Mine Fanagalo and Garden Fanagalo as being basically the same pidgin. He suggests that Garden Fanagalo should be seen as lying towards the English end of a continuum, and Mine Fanagalo closer to the Zulu end.

Several key features differentiate Fanagalo from the Nguni languages (such as Zulu and Xhosa).  functions as both an article and a demonstrative, while only a demonstrative in Zulu.  is used to mean "here", also meaning "there" when the first syllable is stressed, and is also used as a general preposition for location. (It works for anything such as "on", or "near", etc.) Zulu, on the other hand, uses only  to mean "here". Zulu uses only pronouns for emphasis, relying instead on verb agreement markers, much like Spanish. 

The past tense of verbs is marked by the suffix  ( "I go, go!",  "I went"), and the future with the modal  ( "will go").

Here are two examples (all letters are pronounced):-

Cock Robin

All birds of air, they cried, they cried

They heard the death the bird Cock Robin

Who they killed Cock Robin

Me, said the sparrow

With the little bow & arrow of mine

I killed Cock Robin

(The Lord's Prayer)

Father of ours, You are above<

We thank (for) the name of you

Give us today etc., etc...

See also 
 Pidgin
 Creole language
 Tsotsitaal

References 

 
Lunga, Violet Bridget (2004). "Mapping African Postcoloniality: Linguistic and Cultural Spaces of Hybridity". Perspectives on Global Development and Technology. 3 (3): 291–326. doi:10.1163/1569150042442502. ISSN 1569-1500
Mesthrie, Rajend (2019-08-27). "Fanakalo as a mining language in South Africa: A new overview". International Journal of the Sociology of Language. 2019 (258): 13–33. doi:10.1515/ijsl-2019-2027. ISSN 0165-2516.

External links 
https://www.sahistory.org.za/article/fanakalo-language-mining-culture
https://www.researchgate.net/publication/321276626_Fanakalo
 South African Language: Fanagalo
 Fanagalo translation
 

Bantu-based pidgins and creoles
Languages of Zambia
Languages of Zimbabwe
Languages of South Africa
Click languages
Zulu language